Wila Wilani (Aymara wila blood, blood-red, the reduplication indicates that there is a group or a complex of something, -ni a suffix to indicate ownership, "the one with a complex of red color" or "the one with a lot of blood", hispanicized spelling Vilavilani) is an archaeological site with rock art in Peru. It is located in the Tacna Region, Tacna Province, Palca District, near Wila Wilani (Vilavilane, Vilavilani). The motives of the paintings are predominantly hunting scenes with camelids.

References 

 geoview.info Pintura rupestre Vilavilani. Retrieved March 31, 2014

Archaeological sites in Peru
Archaeological sites in Tacna Region
Rock art in South America
Populated places in the Tacna Region